Westlake High School is a public high school in unincorporated territory of Travis County, Texas, west of and adjacent to Austin. The school is a part of the Eanes Independent School District. Westlake High School is the only high school in the Eanes ISD and serves West Lake Hills, Rollingwood, parts of Southwest Austin, as well as parts of unincorporated Travis County. The school was established in 1969 and opened in 1970.

In 2011, Westlake was ranked 72 on Newsweek magazine's list of America's best high schools. In 2012, Westlake was #160 in the Newsweek poll. In 2013, Westlake was #93 and in 2014, it was #117.

In high school rankings by The Washington Post, Westlake was #136 in 2014 and 2013. In 2012, it was #106 in The Washington Post poll, #59 in 2011, and #52 in 2010.

Extracurricular activities

Westlake was moved to the state's highest classification in 2014 when Texas added a 6A classification.

Academics
UIL Academic Meet Champions 
1993(4A)
HOSA

Athletics
The Westlake Chaparrals compete in these sports: volleyball, cross country, football, basketball, powerlifting, wrestling, swimming, soccer, lacrosse, golf, tennis, track, baseball, softball, dance, and cheerleading.

State titles
Baseball
1980(3A), 1984(4A)
Girls' basketball
1993(4A), 1995(5A), 1996(5A)
Boys' cross country
1979(B), 1981(4A)
Girls' cross country
1975(B), 1976(B), 1977(B), 1985(4A), 1990(4A)
Football
1996(5A), 2019(6A/D2), 2020(6A/D1) 2021(6A/D2)
Boys' golf
1980(3A), 1996(5A), 1999(5A), 2001(5A), 2009(5A), 2010(5A), 2014(5A), 2017(6A), 2018(6A), 2019(6A), 2021(6A)
Girls' golf 
 2019(6A)
Boys' swimming
2006(5A)
Girls' swimming
1980(All), 1996(All), 1997(All), 2007(5A), 2008(5A), 2014(5A), 2015(5A)
Team tennis
1984(4A), 1985(4A), 1992(4A), 2006(5A), 2007(5A), 2009(4A)
Volleyball
1991(4A), 1993(4A), 2002(5A), 2004(5A)
Rugby
2015, 2016

Orchestra
The orchestra program currently has three full orchestras competing in UIL each year.

Band
The Westlake High School Chaparral Band has been named the Texas State Honor Band three times (AA, AAA, and AAAA) in its 30-year history. The marching band has been invited to the Rose Parade in Pasadena, California. 

A select group of Chap Band student musicians performed at the bi-annual conference of the internationally recognized World Association for Symphonic Bands (WASBE) in Cincinnati, OH in July 2009. The invitation to perform at WASBE is the first ever extended to a high school band organization.

State titles
Marching Band Sweepstakes Champions
1979(3A), 1982(3A)

Cheerleading
The Westlake Cheer Program's Red Team won the 2013, 2014, 2015 and 2019 UCA Super Varsity Division 1 National High School Cheerleading Championships.

Notable alumni 

Kyle Adams, NFL tight end
Calvin Anderson, NFL offensive lineman
Angela Bettis, actress 
Ben Breedlove, Internet celebrity 
Drew Brees (Class of 1996), NFL quarterback, Super Bowl XLIV champion and MVP; played for the San Diego Chargers and New Orleans Saints 
Bradley Buckman, professional basketball player
Fernanda Contreras, tennis player
Sam Ehlinger, quarterback for the Indianapolis Colts, previously UT
Nick Foles, NFL quarterback, Super Bowl LII champion and MVP with the Philadelphia Eagles
Kylen Granson, NFL player
Camila Grey, singer  
Kelly Gruber, MLB third baseman
Bryce Hager, NFL linebacker
Jesse Heiman, actor
Josh Ilika, Olympic swimmer
Alexis Jones, activist and motivational speaker
Cade Klubnik, quarterback for the Clemson Tigers
Akie Kotabe, actor
Will Licon, UT swimmer
Paul London, professional wrestler
Seth McKinney, NFL offensive lineman
Chris Mihm, NBA center
Akshay Nanavati, author
Tanner Price, football quarterback
Rich Riley, business executive
Jay Rodgers, NFL coach
Calvin Schiraldi, MLB pitcher
Scott Spann, Olympic swimmer
Huston Street, MLB pitcher
Ryan Swope, football wide receiver
Lia Thomas, transgender swimmer on the University of Pennsylvania swim team
Justin Tucker, NFL kicker, Super Bowl XLVII champion with the Baltimore Ravens
Ross William Ulbricht, creator of the Silk Road
Lauren Worsham, actress

In popular culture 
Neptune High, the high school in Veronica Mars, is partially based on Westlake, where the father of writer-producer Rob Thomas once served as vice-principal.

In Friday Night Lights, the team played in the pilot episode, the Westerby Chaps, is based on the Westlake High School football team. All scenes involving the Chaps were filmed at Westlake High School, with real students portraying fans.

References

External links
 Westlake High School
 
 
  - from the WHS Webmastering Class, prior to 2000

Educational institutions established in 1958
Educational institutions established in 1969
Public high schools in Travis County, Texas
1958 establishments in Texas